Xa Dung is a commune (xã) and village of the Điện Biên Đông District of Điện Biên Province, northwestern Vietnam. The commune covers an area of 89.48 square kilometres and has a reported population of 4915.

References

Communes of Điện Biên province
Geography of Điện Biên province